The VN750, also known as the Vulcan 750, is a 750 cc class cruiser-style motorcycle made by Kawasaki from 1985 to 2006. The Vulcan 750 was Kawasaki's first cruiser and first V-twin engine, introduced in late 1984 as the 1985 model.

Production history
Kawasaki introduced the 750 cc class Vulcan worldwide in 1985. Due to tariff restrictions in the United States on bikes over 700 cc imported from Japan, the initial US spec model was limited to 699 cc and called the Kawasaki Vulcan 700. The tariff was lifted in 1986, and all bikes from then until the production run ended in 2006 were 749 cc. The US name was changed to Vulcan 750 to reflect this.

Overview
The VN750 remained largely unchanged throughout its 22-year production run with only minor adjustments to the components and varying paint schemes. The VN750 was unique in its class by featuring a more reliable shaft drive usually found on larger cruisers. The motorcycle also featured a liquid-cooled DOHC V-twin engine producing 66 horsepower and 47 ft-lbs of torque. Notably, the torque cruve is quite flat, producing high torque throughout most of the rpm range. And, the engine was underrated and commonly produced 8-10% more than the advertised power during dynamometer testing. . The bike was configured to support an upright riding position with a king/queen seat and a factory installed sissy bar. The VN750 also featured adjustable air shocks front and rear, with Showa 4-way valving on the rear.

References

Vulcan 750
Cruiser motorcycles
Motorcycles introduced in 1985